Hunnewell may refer to:

Places in the United States
Hunnewell, Kansas
Hunnewell, Kentucky
Hunnewell, Missouri
H. H. Hunnewell estate, Wellesley, Massachusetts
Hunnewell Estates Historic District, Wellesley, Massachusetts

People
H. H. Hunnewell (1810–1902), railroad financier, horticulturist, philanthropist
Susannah Hunnewell (1966–2019), American editor and publisher